City of Lost Souls may refer to:
 The City of Lost Souls, a 2000 Japanese action film
 City of Lost Souls (1983 film), a German musical film
 City of Lost Souls (novel), a 2012 novel by Cassandra Clare